Ralph Strait (July 8, 1936 – July 31, 1992) was an American actor who starred in film and on television. He was known for his role in the 1982 cult film The Beastmaster as Sacco, also that year he played a supporting role in the horror movie Halloween III: Season of the Witch as Buddy Kupfer, and that year he starred in They Call Me Bruce?.

He starred on the soap opera Search for Tomorrow as Dan Stone from 1985-1986. Strait had made guest appearances on TV shows, some of those shows range from The Incredible Hulk, Eight Is Enough, and Magnum, P.I.. In 1992, Strait died at the age of 56 in New York City of a heart attack.

Filmography

References

External links
 
 

1936 births
1992 deaths
American male film actors
American male soap opera actors
American male television actors
20th-century American male actors